José María Oliveira Aldamiz was a Spanish film director.  He was also one of the earliest Spaniards to join the Church of Jesus Christ of Latter-day Saints (LDS Church) and the first stake president in Spain.

Early in his career Oliveira worked for the William Morris Agency and was involved in the casting of American films in Spain.  He married the American actress Patricia Wright.  Wright was a Latter-day Saint and this is how Oliveira was exposed to the LDS Church.  He was baptized in France in 1966.

Oliveira's two most prominent works are Las flores del miedo (1973) and Los muertos, la carne y el diablo (1974).  In 1982 when the Madrid Spain Stake was organized Oliveira was called as its first president.

Sources
LDS film bio for Oliveira

Spanish leaders of the Church of Jesus Christ of Latter-day Saints
Spanish film directors
Converts to Mormonism